The 2023 FIM Women's Motocross World Championship is the 19th Women's Motocross World Championship season. Nancy van de Ven is the defending champion, after taking her first title in 2022.

2023 Calendar
A 5-round calendar for the 2023 season was announced on 11 October 2022.

Participants

References 

Motocross Women
Womens
FIM Motocross Women